Drum Song is an album by drummer Philly Joe Jones which was recorded in 1978, at the same sessions that produced Advance!, but not released on the Galaxy label until 1985.

Reception

The AllMusic review by Scott Yanow stated "Hard bop is spoken here on this straightahead set. Drummer Philly Joe Jones is the leader but the main emphasis is on such soloists as trumpeter Blue Mitchell (heard in one of his last recordings), the tenors of Harold Land and Charles Bowen, pianist Cedar Walton and trombonist Slide Hampton who arranged the four full-band numbers".

Track listing
All compositions by Slide Hampton except where noted
 "Our Delight" (Tadd Dameron) – 6:14
 "I Waited for You" (Gil Fuller, Dizzy Gillespie) – 5:44
 "Bird" – 6:35
 "Two Bass Hit" (Gillespie, John Lewis) – 5:18
 "Hi-Fly" (Randy Weston) – 7:45
 "Drum Song" – 6:21

Personnel
Philly Joe Jones – drums 
Blue Mitchell – trumpet
Slide Hampton – trombone, arranger
Harold Land – tenor saxophone
Charles Bowen – tenor saxophone, soprano saxophone
Cedar Walton – piano
Marc Johnson – bass

References

Galaxy Records albums
Philly Joe Jones albums
1985 albums
Albums arranged by Slide Hampton